The 1970 Florida Attorney General election was held on November 3, 1970. Robert L. Shervin would be elected winning 61.43% of the vote and defeated Thom Rumberger.

Primary elections

Democratic Primary 
The Democratic Party would hold its primary on September 8, 1970.

Candidates 

 Robert L. Shevin
 Elmer Friday, State Senator and former Lee County judge.
 William A. Meadows, Jr.

Republican Primary 
The Republican Party did not hold a primary as Thom Rumberger was unopposed.

General election

Candidates 
Robert L. Shevin, Democratic

Thom Rumberger, Republican

Results

References 

Florida Attorney General elections
Florida
1970 Florida elections